Events from the year 1968 in South Korea.

Incumbents
President: Park Chung-hee 
Prime Minister: Chung Il-kwon

Events
January 17–29 - Blue House Raid
January 23 - USS Pueblo (AGER-2) captured by North Korea
February 6 - U.S. 2nd Infantry Division guard post attacked. 3 North Koreans killed by U.S. forces.
March 27 - U.S. 2nd Infantry Division and ROK 25th Infantry Division ambush North Korean infiltrators. 3 North Koreans killed.
April 1 – POSCO founded in Gyeongsangnam-do, as predecessor name was Pohang Steel.
April 14 - U.S. Army Support Group truck ambushed south of the Joint Security Area in daylight.
April 21 - 5 North Koreans killed and 15 North Koreans wounded by U.S. forces.
July 3 - U.S. 2nd Infantry Division patrol ambushed in the DMZ.
July 20 - U.S. 2nd Infantry Division patrol ambushed in the DMZ.
July 21 - U.S. 2nd Infantry Division patrol ambushed in the DMZ.
July 30 - U.S. 2nd Infantry Division patrol ambushed in the DMZ.
August 5 - U.S. 2nd Infantry Division patrol ambushed south of the DMZ in daylight. 1 North Korean killed by U.S. forces.
September 19 - 4 North Koreans killed by U.S. forces.
September 27 - U.S. 2nd Infantry Division jeep ambushed in the DMZ.
October 3 - one North Korean killed by U.S. forces.
October 5 - U.S. 2nd Infantry Division patrol ambushed in the DMZ.
October 11 - U.S. 2nd Infantry Division patrol ambushed North Korean Army infiltrators in the DMZ. 2 North Koreans killed by U.S. forces.
October 23 - U.S. 2nd Infantry Division patrol engaged KPA infiltrators in the DMZ. one North Korean killed by U.S. forces.
October 30 - Ulchin-Samcheok (Gangwon-do) landings by 120 men of North Korean Army Unit 124; 110 of them were killed, 7 were captured and 3 escaped. 40 South Korean soldiers and police officers and 23 South Korean civilians were killed.
December 23 - Crew of USS Pueblo released at Panmunjom.

Births
January 14 - Kim Byung-Joo, judoka
February 22 - Kim Jung-ju, businessman (d. 2022)
July 14 - Hwang Sun-Hong, football player and manager

Deaths

See also
List of South Korean films of 1968
Korean DMZ Conflict (1966–69)

 
1960s in South Korea